The Forty-Fifth Wisconsin Legislature convened from  to  in regular session.

Senators representing even-numbered districts were newly elected for this session and were serving the first two years of a four-year term. Assembly members were elected to a two-year term. Assembly members and even-numbered senators were elected in the general election of November 6, 1900. Senators representing odd-numbered districts were serving the third and fourth year of a four-year term, having been elected in the general election of November 8, 1898.

Major events
 January 7, 1901: Inauguration of Robert M. La Follette as the 20th Governor of Wisconsin.  He was the first governor of Wisconsin to have been born in Wisconsin.
 January 22, 1901: Queen Victoria of the United Kingdom died and was succeeded by her son, Edward VII.
 March 4, 1901: Second inauguration of U.S. President William McKinley.
 September 6, 1901: President William McKinley was shot by anarchist Leon Czolgosz in Buffalo, New York.  He would die 8 days later.
 September 14, 1901: Vice President Theodore Roosevelt was sworn in as the 26th President of the United States, following the death of President William McKinley.
 October 1, 1901: The Wisconsin Legislative Reference Library was opened in the State Capitol under chief Charles McCarthy.  The library was the first of its kind and was a model for the Congressional Research Service.
 April 2, 1902: The Electric Theatre, the first movie theater in the United States, opened in Los Angeles, California.
 May 11, 1902: Wisconsin Lieutenant Governor Jesse Stone died of stomach cancer at Watertown, Wisconsin.
 June 29, 1902: The federal Spooner Act, named for Wisconsin's U.S. senator John Coit Spooner, was signed by President Theodore Roosevelt, to purchase land that would become the Panama Canal Zone.
 July 1, 1902: The Philippine Organic Act was signed by President Theodore Rooselvelt, bringing an end to the Philippine–American War.
 November 4, 1902: Wisconsin general election:
 Robert M. La Follette re-elected as Governor of Wisconsin.
 Voters approved an amendment to the Wisconsin constitution to authorize a general banking law and remove previous referendum requirements for banking laws.
 Voters approved an amendment to the Wisconsin constitution to convert the Superintendent of Public Instruction to a nonpartisan, 4-year office, with pay set by legislation.
 Voters approved an amendment to the Wisconsin constitution to prohibit individuals, companies, political committees, and other entities from providing any free pass, free transportation, or free communication to any officer of state, local, or county government in Wisconsin.

Major legislation
 April 12, 1901: An Act to apportion and district anew the state of Wisconsin into assembly districts, 1901 Act 164.
 May 6, 1901: An Act to apportion and district anew the state of Wisconsin into senate districts, 1901 Act 309.
 May 13, 1901: An Act to apportion and district anew the state of Wisconsin into congressional districts, 1901 Act 398.
 Joint Resolution agreeing to a proposed amendment to article XI of the constitution of the state of Wisconsin, giving the legislature power to pass a general banking law, 1901 Joint Resolution 2.  This was the second required legislative approval of this amendment, which was then ratified by voters in November 1902.
 Joint Resolution agreeing to constitutional amendment, 1901 Joint Resolution 3.  Amendment (1) converting the Superintendent of Public Instruction of Wisconsin from a political to nonpartisan office, (2) moving the elections for superintendent from Fall to Spring, (3) changing the term from two years to four years, (4) moving inauguration from the first Monday in the January following the election to the first Monday in the July following the election, and (5) enabling the Legislature to set the pay of the superintendent through law.  This was the second required legislative approval of this amendment, which was then ratified by voters in November 1902.
 Joint Resolution for the submission of an amendment to section 1 of article VII of the constitution relating to the justices of the supreme court, 1901 Joint Resolution 8.  Proposed adding two more justices to the Wisconsin Supreme Court, and proposing a process to determine the chief justice when two justices held equal seniority.
 Joint Resolution agreeing to a proposed amendment to article XIII of the constitution of the state of Wisconsin, to prohibit the pass system, 1901 Joint Resolution 9.  This was the second required legislative approval of this amendment, which was then ratified by voters in November 1902.
 Joint Resolution providing for an amendment of section 23, article IV of the constitution and for separate county government in certain counties, 1901 Joint Resolution 12.  Suggested an amendment to allow the Legislature to establish a separate system of county government that could be applied to creating new counties around cities with populations greater than 100,000.

Summary

Senate summary

Assembly summary

Sessions
 1st Regular session: January 9, 1901May 15, 1901

Leaders

Senate leadership
 President of the Senate: Jesse Stone (R) (until May 11, 1902)
 President pro tempore: James J. McGillivray (R–Black River Falls)

Assembly leadership
 Speaker of the Assembly: George H. Ray (R–La Crosse)

Members

Members of the Senate
Members of the Senate for the Forty-Fifth Wisconsin Legislature:

Members of the Assembly
Members of the Assembly for the Forty-Fifth Wisconsin Legislature:

Committees

Senate committees
 Senate Committee on AgricultureReynolds, chair
 Senate Committee on Assessment and Collection of TaxesWhitehead, chair
 Senate Committee on Banks and InsuranceRoehr, chair
 Senate Committee on Bills on Third ReadingGaveney, chair
 Senate Committee on CorporationsDevos, chair
 Senate Committee on EducationStout, chair
 Senate Committee on Enrolled BillsFearne, chair
 Senate Committee on Engrossed BillsMiller, chair
 Senate Committee on Federal RelationsMartin, chair
 Senate Committee on the JudiciaryKreutzer, chair
 Senate Committee on Legislative ExpensesWilly, chair
 Senate Committee on Manufactures and LaborAnson, chair
 Senate Committee on Military AffairsKnudsen, chair
 Senate Committee on Privileges and ElectionsHatton, chair
 Senate Committee on Public HealthEaton, chair
 Senate Committee on Public LandsHagemeister, chair
 Senate Committee on RailroadsHarris, chair
 Senate Committee on Roads and BridgesO'Neil, chair
 Senate Committee on State AffairsJones, chair
 Senate Committee on Town and County OrganizationsRiordans, chair

Assembly committees
 Assembly Committee on AgricultureR. Holland, chair
 Assembly Committee on Assessment and Collection of TaxesA. R. Hall, chair
 Assembly Committee on Bills on Third ReadingG. Ela, chair
 Assembly Committee on CitiesF. B. Keene, chair
 Assembly Committee on CorporationsL. M. Sturdevant, chair
 Assembly Committee on Dairy and FoodS. D. Slade, chair
 Assembly Committee on EducationJ. Johnston, chair
 Assembly Committee on Enrolled BillsA. Jensen, chair
 Assembly Committee on Engrossed BillsJ. M. Barlow, chair
 Assembly Committee on Federal RelationsC. Sarau, chair
 Assembly Committee on Finance, Banks and InsuranceE. A. Williams, chair
 Assembly Committee on the JudiciaryP. A. Orton, chair
 Assembly Committee on Legislative ExpendituresM. O. Galaway, chair
 Assembly Committee on Lumber and MiningA. E. Smith, chair
 Assembly Committee on ManufacturesR. F. Thiessenhusen, chair
 Assembly Committee on Military AffairsA. C. Dodge, chair
 Assembly Committee on Privileges and ElectionsE. H. Steiger, chair
 Assembly Committee on Public Health and SanitationJ. Willott, chair
 Assembly Committee on Public ImprovementsE. F. Clark, chair
 Assembly Committee on Public LandsD. Evans, chair
 Assembly Committee on RailroadsJ. W. Thomas, chair
 Assembly Committee on Roads and BridgesF. J. Frost, chair
 Assembly Committee on State AffairsK. E. Rasmussen, chair
 Assembly Committee on Town and County OrganizationsW. J. Middleton, chair
 Assembly Committee on Ways and MeansH. Overbeck, chair

Joint committees
 Joint Committee on Charitable and Penal InstitutionsStebbins (Sen.) & A. H. Dahl (Asm.), co-chairs
 Joint Committee on ClaimsMills (Sen.) & Fred Hartung (Asm.), co-chairs
 Joint Committee on Fish and GameGreen (Sen.) & August Zinn (Asm.), co-chairs
 Joint Committee on Forestry and LumberMcDonough (Sen.) & Ole Erickson (Asm.), co-chairs
 Joint Committee on PrintingMunson (Sen.) & Ole K. Roe (Asm.), co-chairs
 Special Joint Committee on ApportionmentRiordan (Sen.) & George H. Ray (Asm.), co-chairs

Employees

Senate employees

Senate Chief Clerk's Department
 Chief Clerk: Walter Houser
 Journal Clerk: F. E. Andrews
 Bookkeeper: Andrew Rood
 Proofreader: I. S. Dunn
 Engrossing Clerk: Fred Peterson
 Assistant Engrossing Clerk: D. G. Sampson
 Enrolling Clerk: A. B. Cargill
 Assistant Enrolling Clerk: G. A. Tucker
 Index Clerk: Frank Eaton
 Assistant Index Clerk: Ed. F. Ditmar
 Clerk for the Judiciary Committee: Percy S. Elwell
 Clerk for the Committee on Bills on 3rd Reading: John Meili
 Clerk for the Committee on Claims: G. I. McDonald
 Clerk for the Committee on State Affairs: Hugh Wilson
 Committee Clerks and Assistants:
 Arthur M. Fisher
 M. V. Dorwin
 Stenographers: 
 E. B. Yule
 John D. Gill
 Robert M. Davis
 Nelson M. Wilcox
 Comparing Clerks:
 E. D. Peake
 Mrs. Maud Barnes
 Ida M. Goss
 Oscar Kreutzer
 Telephone Attendant: Harry Lamphere
 Custodian of the Engrossing Room: B. H. Strow
 Custodian of the Enrolling Room: A. Burson

Senate Sergeant-at-Arms' Department
 Sergeant-at-Arms: Charles A. Pettibone
 Assistant Sergeant-at-Arms: O. B. Moon
 Postmaster: Christoph Paulus
 Assistant Postmaster: H. W. Rood
 Document Clerk: E. A. Hanks
 Document Room Attendant: L. L. Lathrop
 Doorkeepers:
 Fred Hanson
 Robert Lowerre
 Richard Lubnow
 S. A. Pettibone
 Gallery Attendant: Will Thomas
 General Attendants: 
 Hugo Jeske
 F. F. Massant
 Night Watch: Walther Abel
 Janitor: Dana Woodworth
 Custodian: Jacob Ditschler
 Laborer: James F. Holt
 Messengers:
 Harry Kelly
 Darwin Fallott
 Jno. Taylor
 Jno. F. Trainor
 Harry E. May
 E. C. Mills
 Emil J. Reuther
 William Holmes

Assembly employees

Assembly Chief Clerk's Department
 Chief Clerk: Winslow A. Nowell
 Assistant Chief Clerk: Frederic W. Coon
 Journal Clerks:
 Fred Nelson
 Edward H. McNeill
 Bookkeepers: 
 Jos. B. Foster
 C. E. Shaffer
 Proofreader: J. H. Waggoner
 Engrossing Clerk: C. H. Carter
 Assistant Engrossing Clerk: Claire Currier
 Enrolling Clerk: J. K. Smith
 Assistant Enrolling Clerk: John Eckstrome
 Index Clerk: Fred H. Hartwell
 Assistant Index Clerk: Bert S. Oscar
 Stationary Clerk: Henry H. McGraw
 Clerk for the Judiciary Committee: James McKesson
 Clerk for the Committee on Bills on 3rd Reading: Edgar I. Waring
 Clerk for the Committee on Enrolled Bills: Jessie A. Jensen
 Clerk for the Committee on Engrossed Bills: James DeGarmo
 Clerk for the Committee on State Affairs: E. N. Bowers
 General Committee Clerks:
 Thomas Toner
 Thomas Hayes
 Stenographers:
 Almeda Sturdevant
 Louis Kloepfel
 Raymond Frazier
 Charles Voigt
 Comparing Clerks:
 Mary E. Chadwick
 Effie Heydlauff
 Aluna Christie
 Nellie L. Proctor

Assembly Sergeant-at-Arms' Department
 Sergeant-at-Arms: A. M. Anderson
 Assistant Sergeant-at-Arms: Jeremiah Wallace Baldock
 Postmaster: E. B. Tousley
 Assistant Postmaster: J. A. Kellman
 Document Clerks:
 J. H. Foster
 J. J. Osborn
 Day Attendant: H. T. Mower
 Doorkeepers:
 Victor Cronk
 Charles J. Weisser
 J. B. Nuegent
 Lansing Williams
 Gallery Attendants:
 Julius Howland
 Peter Steinert
 Porter: George Coulter
 Flagman: Frank Voeltner
 Night Watch: J. R. Fisher
 Committee Room Custodians:
 Robert Drews
 Abe Herman
 Cloak Room Attendants:
 J. T. Johnson
 J. R. Jones

References

External links
 1901: Related Documents from Wisconsin Legislature

1901 in Wisconsin
1902 in Wisconsin
Wisconsin
Wisconsin legislative sessions